Novyi Kalyniv is a small city in Sambir Raion (district), Lviv Oblast (region) of Ukraine. Novyi Kalyniv hosts the administration of Novyi Kalyniv urban hromada, one of the hromadas of Ukraine. Population: . Local government — Novyi Kalyniv city council.

The city was built in 1951 as a military settlement for the Soviet airbase Novy Kalinov.

References 

Cities in Lviv Oblast
Populated places established in the Ukrainian Soviet Socialist Republic
Cities of district significance in Ukraine
1951 establishments in Ukraine